The Proprietor is a 1996 film. It is a U.S.-French co-production Merchant Ivory film, directed by Ismail Merchant for Jeanne Moreau's request.

Cast

Starring
Jeanne Moreau as Adrienne Mark
Sean Young as Virginia Kelly
Sam Waterston as Harry Bancroft
Christopher Cazenove as Elliott Spencer
Nell Carter as Millie Jackson
Jean-Pierre Aumont as Franz Legendre
Austin Pendleton as Willy Kunst
Charlotte de Turckheim as Judith Mark
Pierre Vaneck as Raymond T.K
Marc Tissot as Patrice Legendre
Josh Hamilton as William O'Hara

New York
Joanna Adler as F. Freemder
James Naughton as Texans
J. Smith-Cameron as Texans
Michael Bergin as Bobby
John Dalton as Emilio
Jack Koenig as Apartment Doorman
Panther as Guardian Angels
Bull as Guardian Angels
Kim Gilmore as Guardian Angels
Falcon as Guardian Angels
Joan Audiberti as French Ladies
Katherine Argo as French Ladies
Judy Alanna as Woman in Park

Paris
Hubert St. Macary - Taxi Driver
Diane Nignan - Pedestrian
Guillemette Grobon - Suzanne T.K

The Apartment
Cherif Ezzeldin as French Couple
Valérie Tolédano as French Couple
Jorg Schnass as German Couple
Paula Klein as German Couple
Suzanna Pattoni asConcierge

The Auction
Alain Rimoux as Noraire
Humbert Balsan as Maître Vicks
Donald Rosenfeld as Maître Ertaud

French Television
Franck de la Personne as TV Moderator
Gilles Arbona as Politician
Henri Garcin as Interviewer
Jeanne-Marie Darblay as Journalist

Cannes
Kathryn Kinley as Entertainment Tonight presenter

Paris 1943, Maison Madeleine
Marjolaine DeGraeve as Young Adrienne
Carole Franck as Shop Assistants
Azmine Jaffer as Shop Assistants
Brigitte Catillon as Aristocratic Lady

Maxims Restaurant
Jean-Yves Dubois as Fan-Fan
Hervé Briaux as Aristocratic Man

Girl in the Nightclub
Sophie Camus as Girl in the Nightclub

'Je m'appelle France'
Éric Ruf as Theodore
Élodie Bouchez as Young Girl
Judith Rémy sa Nadine

'Call me French'
Sean Young as Sally
Wade Childress as Ben
Thomas Tomazewski as Franck

References

External links
Merchant Ivory Production
IMDb

1996 films
1996 drama films
American drama films
Films directed by Ismail Merchant
French drama films
English-language French films
1990s French-language films
Largo Entertainment films
Merchant Ivory Productions films
Warner Bros. films
1990s American films
1990s French films